Apriona germari (also known as the mulberry longhorn beetle) is a species of beetle in the subfamily Lamiinae, found in India, through Southeast Asia, to southern China. It is mostly yellow in colour.

References

Batocerini
Beetles described in 1851
Beetles of Asia
Insects of China
Insects of India